The SCW Junior Heavyweight Championship was a professional wrestling light heavyweight championship in Southern Championship Wrestling (SCW). It was defended in the promotion from 1997 to 2000, and briefly reactivated on November 20, 2004 when SCW held its final show.

The inaugural champion was "The Iceman" Chris Cannon, who defeated Preston Quinn in a tournament final on February 22, 1997 to become the first SCW Heavyweight Champion. Joey Matthews holds the record for most reigns, with three. At 268 days, Chris Cannon's first and only reign is the longest in the title's history. Krazy K's reign was the shortest in the history of the title as it was won on the promotion's final show. Overall, there have been 12 reigns shared between 8 wrestlers, with three vacancies, and 2 deactivations.

Title history
Key

Names

Reigns

List of combined reigns

Footnotes

References
General

Specific

External links
SCWprowrestling.com
SCW Junior Heavyweight Title at Genickbruch.com

Southern Championship Wrestling championships
Junior heavyweight wrestling championships